State Route 189 (SR 189) is a  state highway that runs south-to-north through portions of Dade and Walker counties in the northwestern part of the U.S. state of Georgia.

Route description
SR 189 begins at an intersection with SR 136 southeast of Trenton, in Dade County. It heads northeast through part of Cloudland Canyon State Park and has a small wobble into Walker County before going back into Dade County. It heads northwest and curves to the northeast until it meets SR 157 (Hinkle Road). The two routes run concurrent to the northeast. On the southwestern edge of Lookout Mountain, they cut across the eastern edge of Covenant College. They briefly run along the Dade–Walker county line, with SR 157 splitting off onto McFarland Road, before SR 189 crosses back into Dade County. The road enters Walker County for the last time until it meets its northern terminus, a connection with Tennessee State Route 148 at the Tennessee state line on the Lookout Mountain, Georgia–Lookout Mountain, Tennessee city line. SR 189 is not part of the National Highway System.

Major intersections

See also

References

External links

 Georgia Roads (Routes 181 - 200)

189
Transportation in Dade County, Georgia
Transportation in Walker County, Georgia